Eridachtha prolocha is a moth in the family Lecithoceridae. It was described by Edward Meyrick in 1910. It is found in southern India.

The wingspan is 15–16 mm. The forewings are grey brown and the hindwings are grey.

References

Moths described in 1910
Eridachtha